Table football, also known as foosball or table soccer, is a table-top game that is loosely based on association football. The aim of the game is to move the ball into the opponent's goal by manipulating rods which have figures attached. Although rules often vary by country and region when the game is played casually, at the competitive level table soccer is played according to a unified code.

History

Patents for similar table games date back as early as the 1890s in Spain, Europe. However, foosball's origins date to 1921, when Harold Searles Thornton from the United Kingdom patented the game as "Apparatus for playing a game of table football".

Thornton invented a football game that people could play in their homes due to the popularity of association football in Europe. The game adopted the name foosball in the United States via German imports that called it "tischfußball" ( "table football"). Its design inspiration came from a box of matches.

Belgian magazine Le Soir illustré claimed in 1979 that the French inventor Lucien Rosengart (1881–1976) came up with the game of table soccer in the 1930s when he was looking for things to keep his grandchildren entertained during the cold winter months. He called the game "baby foot" instead of foosball.

The Galician inventor Alejandro Finisterre patented his invention of table football, futbolín, in Madrid during the Spanish Civil War in 1937. His version of the game is the one used in modern-day table football.

The game was eventually brought to the United States in the 1950s by Lawrence Patterson, reaching its peak of popularity there in the 1970s, when it could be found in bars and pool halls everywhere throughout the country.

In 2002, the International Table Soccer Federation (ITSF) was established in France with the mission of promoting the game. The ITSF acts as an organising sports body, regulating international competitions and establishing the game with the International Olympic Committee and General Association of International Sport Federation.

The game

The game involves using figures mounted on rotating bars to kick a ball into the opposing goal. The table usually contains eight rows of foos men, which are plastic, metal, wooden, or sometimes carbon-fibre figures mounted on horizontal metal bars. Each team of one or two human players controls four rows of foos men, one row each for the goalkeeper, defenders, midfield and strikers. Players manipulate the rods to control the figures, using them to hold up, pass or 'kick' the ball. Games begin when the ball is served through a hole at the side of the table, or simply placed by hand at the feet of a figure in the centre of the table. A coin toss is usually used to determine which player or team serves first. If it is not the first match or if the ball gets out of play or if the ball suddenly stops out, then the team scored last would get the serve after he scores one. The term for when the ball leaves the table or gets stopped somewhere out of the men-like figures’ reach is dead ball. Expert players have been known to move balls at speeds up to 56 km/h (35 mph) in competition.

The rules prohibit "over 360-degree shots", or "spinning": using the palm of the hand to swiftly spin the bar all around, instead of using wrist strokes to kick the ball with a bar-mounted figure.  Since the establishment of the International Table Soccer Federation (ITSF), the rules have become standardised in most international competitions. However, since January 2012, the annual World Championships and the World Cup have permitted two full 360-degree rotations.

The winner is determined when one team scores a predetermined number of goals, typically five, ten or eleven in competition. When playing Bonzini competitions, the target number of goals is seven and players must win by at least two clear goals.

The following arrangement is common to ITSF competition tables, though there are substantial variations, particularly in Spain and South America, where the Futbolín table model (or variants) is common and uses a different configuration. Looking from left to right on one side of the table, the configuration is usually as follows:

Table football can be played by two individuals (singles), and also with four people (doubles), in which there are teams of two people on either side. In this scenario, one player usually controls the two defensive rows and the other team member uses the midfield and attack rows. In informal matches, three or four players per side are also common.

Spinning the ball while putting it in the play for the advantage of the placement team is allowed. A goal scored only by placing the ball in the hole with spin is legal.

Competition

Table football is often played for fun in pubs, bars, workplaces, schools, and clubs with few rules. Table football is also played in official competitions organized by a number of national organizations, with highly evolved rules and regulations.

The ITSF now regulates International events including the annual World Championships and the World Cup. The World Cup was originally intended to coincide with the FIFA World Cup, but since January 2009 it has run annually. In the ITSF World Cup and World Championships 2013, almost 500 players from 30 countries congregated in Nantes, France to compete. 

The ITSF World Tour has also recently expanded to include Asian countries. China, Taiwan and Malaysia played host to ITSF sanctioned tournaments in 2013. In 2016, the Philippines hosted The Manila Bay Open.

Tables
A vast number of different table types exist. As of 2019, there are 5 official ITSF table brands (Bonzini, Roberto Sport, Garlando, Tornado, Leonhart), which are involved in an ITSF World Cup and World Championships and which may host an ITSF World Series. In the past, these brands also included Fireball, Eurosoccer and Tecball. Moreover, ITSF recognises additional brands for international and professional tournaments, namely Warrior, Fireball, Ullrich Sport, Rosengart and Guardian.

Several companies have created "luxury versions" of table football tables.  There was a 7-metre table created by artist Maurizio Cattelan for a piece called Stadium. It takes 11 players to a side. Differences in the table types have great influence on the playing styles. Most tables have one goalie whose movements are restricted to the goal area. On some of these tables the goalie becomes unable to get the ball once it is stuck out of reach in the corner; others have sloped corners to return the ball to play. Another major difference between table types is found in the balls, which can be made of wood (cork in the case of traditional French tables), various forms of plastic or rarely even marble and metal, varying the speed of shots a great deal, as well as the "grip" between the man and the ball and the ball and the playing surface.

Robotic players
The table football robot Foosbot is claimed to have been beaten by a human several times, but has been tested against expert players. Yet another table football robot is under development by two students at the Technical University of Denmark. The robot uses a camera mounted above an ordinary table.
Another bot has been developed by two students at the EPFL in Switzerland.

See also

 List of world table football champions
 Air hockey
 Button football
 Cue sports
 Fabio Cassanelli
 Football (board game)
 Pfitschigogerl
 Sports table football, the sports table football game of FISTF
 Subbuteo
 Table hockey
 Table tennis

References

External links

 International Table Soccer Federation
 Official website of the spanish historic football table manufacturer
 Models of Futbolin
 How to play foosball?

 
Articles containing video clips
Association football variants
Pub games